Negro Brook is a river in Delaware County, New York and Otsego County, New York. It flows into Charlotte Creek north of Davenport.

References

Rivers of New York (state)
Rivers of Delaware County, New York
Rivers of Otsego County, New York